Armand Drevina (born 3 February 1994) is a German-Kosovar footballer who plays as a midfielder for SC Borussia Freialdenhoven.

Career
Drevina made his professional debut for Alemannia Aachen in the 3. Liga on 17 November 2012, coming on as a substitute in the 85th minute for Robert Leipertz in the 1–2 away loss against VfB Stuttgart II.

References

External links
 Profile at DFB.de
 Profile at kicker.de

1994 births
Living people
People from Heinsberg
Sportspeople from Cologne (region)
Footballers from North Rhine-Westphalia
German people of Kosovan descent
Association football midfielders
German footballers
Kosovan footballers
Alemannia Aachen players
KFC Uerdingen 05 players
FC Wegberg-Beeck players
3. Liga players
Regionalliga players